Adama Fofana (born 20 December 1989) is an Ivorian footballer who plays as a forward.

Career
Fofana made his professional debut with Brescia Calcio during the 2007–08 season. During the 2008–09 season, he played for Como Calcio, playing 18 games with 1 goal and 4 assists. In January 2010, he played again for Brescia.

In June 2014, Fofana joined Inter Milan on a free transfer. In July 2014, Fofana, Roberto Ogunseye, Andrea Romanò and Gianmarco Gabbianelli were signed by Prato in a temporary deal.

References

External links
 Gazzetta.it

1989 births
Living people
Ivorian footballers
Ivorian expatriate footballers
Serie B players
Brescia Calcio players
Como 1907 players
FK Ekranas players
A.C. Prato players
Expatriate footballers in Italy
Expatriate footballers in Lithuania
Association football forwards
Ivorian expatriate sportspeople in Italy
People from Bouaké